Kildare Cathedral, or St Brigid's Cathedral in Kildare, is one of two Church of Ireland cathedrals in the United Dioceses of Meath and Kildare. It is in the ecclesiastical province of Dublin. Originally a Catholic cathedral, it was built in the 13th century on the site of an important Celtic Christian abbey, which is said to have been founded by Saint Brigid in the 5th century. The site was taken over by the Protestant Church of Ireland following the Reformation. There is an Irish round tower in the cathedral grounds.

History

Early history
It is said that in the year 480 (35 years after Saint Patrick settled in Armagh) Saint Brigid arrived in Kildare with her nuns. Her original abbey church may have been a simple wooden building. Soon after her death in 523 A.D., a costly shrine was erected in her honour in a new and larger building. For many centuries Kildare maintained a unique Irish experiment; the Abbess ruled over a double community of women and men, and the Bishop was subordinate in jurisdiction to the abbess.

Between the years 835 and 998 the cathedral was devastated approximately 16 times, so that when the Norman, Ralph of Bristol, became bishop in 1223 it was virtually in ruins. Between then and 1230 it was largely rebuilt, likely in the years following 1223, and probably by Ralph of Bristol who was made Bishop of the see in 1222 and died in 1232.

Still semi-ruinous by 1500, it was derelict by 1649. In 1686 it was partially rebuilt.

Demise and resurrection
The cathedral fell into disrepair following the 16th century English Reformation, and was ruined during the 17th century Irish Confederate Wars.

A near complete restoration of the building was undertaken during the 19th century by George Edmund Street. He started restoration work on the cathedral in 1875, and work continued after his death in 1881 until it was complete in 1896. These works included a new north transept, new chancel, and new west wall as well as rebuilding three sides of the square tower. A new oak roof (which is supported on stone corbels) was built into the wall buttresses.

As part of the cathedral's centenary, the building underwent further restoration including new internal porches, repairs to internal and external stonework and rebuilding of the organ.

Current status and layout

Previously the cathedral of the Diocese of Kildare, it is now one of two cathedrals in the United Dioceses of Meath and Kildare.

The present building is a restored Norman cathedral dating from 1223. The site occupied by the cathedral is likely the site of a pagan shrine to the goddess Brigid and the later of the church of Saint Brigid. A perpetual flame was kept here from pre-Christian times possibly until the time of Henry VIII, who destroyed many monasteries.

The cathedral is cruciform in plan without aisles in the early gothic style with a massive square central tower. All the windows are lancet windows, singles or doubles, but triple lancets in the four gables. Design features include arches which span between buttress to buttress in advance of the side walls.  The parapets are of the stepped Irish type (now much restored) but probably datable to c. 1395, the year in which a Papal relaxation was given to those who visited Kildare and gave alms for the conservation of the church. The interior treatment is plain, the window splays are not moulded, but the rear-arches, which are, spring from shafts with moulded capitals. These shafts are short and terminate in small curved tails.

Features
Features of the cathedral include:
 An altar-tomb effigy of Bishop Walter Wellesley (died 1539) which is an example of 16th century sculpture
 A Sheelagh-na-gig (nude carving), which is unusual to find in cathedrals
 Solid oak stalls for the choir and chapter with acorn and oak leaf carvings.
 The Bishops throne.
 A high-altar area with reproductions of the medieval originals.
 Carved Caen Stone pulpit with carvings of the four evangelists and Irish marble columns.
 The Lady Chapel.
 The organ which was built by Conacher in 1898
 St. Luke stained glass window by Gerda Schurmann (from Czech Republic) dated 1974.
 A stone baptismal font which is not original to the cathedral but is dated from Medieval period.
 The west window, dedicated to St. Patrick, St. Brigid and St. Columba.

Gallery

See also
Dean of Kildare

References

Kildare (town)
Diocese of Meath and Kildare
Kildare
Anglican cathedrals in the Republic of Ireland